Enrique Alejandro González Olvera (born November 4, 1970, in Torreón, Coahuila) is a Mexican sports journalist and presenter, Television Director, Producer and editor, recipient of 7 Emmy awards 18 times Emmy Awards Nominee. 2 The Telly Award Bronze winner. He is currently the Copa Univisión  TUDN Radio Show host and also Strategic Communications Specialist and TV Director and Producer for HISD TV Houston.

References

External links
 Official website

Living people
Mexican journalists
Male journalists
Sports commentators
People from Torreón
1970 births